Grier House, also known as Rogers Funeral Home, is a historic home located at Milford, Sussex County, Delaware.  It was built in 1890, and is a two-story, five bay, center hall, frame dwelling in the Queen Anne style.  It has hipped roof is pierced with dormers that have rounded window cornice heads.  It features a projecting center bay that includes the entrance block, a Palladian window, and a two-story portico with slender, paired, fluted Ionic order columns. A porch extends a round the side and on the other side is a porte cochere.  Between 1921 and 1923 the owner, Dr. Frank L. Grier, remodelled the house. The house was used as a funeral home.

It was added to the National Register of Historic Places in 1983.

References

Houses on the National Register of Historic Places in Delaware
Queen Anne architecture in Delaware
Houses completed in 1890
Houses in Milford, Delaware
Houses in Sussex County, Delaware
National Register of Historic Places in Sussex County, Delaware